Vishal Sharma (born 15 September 1977) is an Indian former cricketer. He played twelve first-class matches for Railways between 1997 and 2000.

See also
 List of Delhi cricketers

References

External links
 

1977 births
Living people
Indian cricketers
Railways cricketers
Cricketers from Delhi